The 2021 East Carolina Pirates football team represented East Carolina University in the 2021 NCAA Division I FBS football season. The Pirates, led by third-year head coach Mike Houston, play their home games at Dowdy–Ficklen Stadium as members of the American Athletic Conference.

After compiling a 7–5 regular season record, the Pirates received a bid to the Military Bowl, where they were due to face the Boston College Eagles. On December 26, the Eagles withdrew from the game, due to COVID-19 issues; the bowl was subsequently canceled.

Previous season

The Pirates finished the 2020 season 3–6, 3–5 in AAC play to finish in ninth place in the conference.

Preseason

American Athletic Conference preseason media poll
The American Athletic Conference preseason media poll was released at the virtual media day held August 4, 2021. Cincinnati, who finished the 2020 season ranked No. 8 nationally, was tabbed as the preseason favorite in the 2021 preseason media poll.

Schedule

Notes
 This game was initially scheduled for ESPNU at 4PM ET, but moved to 9:20PM ET on ESPNews because of a rain delay.

Game summaries

vs. Appalachian State

vs. South Carolina

at Marshall

Charleston Southern

Tulane

at UCF

at Houston

South Florida

Temple

at Memphis

at Navy

No. 4 Cincinnati

References

East Carolina
East Carolina Pirates football seasons
East Carolina Pirates football